Lords of the Ultra-Realm is a six-issue comic book limited series, created and written by Doug Moench, illustrated by Pat Broderick, and published in 1986 by DC Comics, followed by a 1987 special issue.

Plot
Vietnam veteran Michael Savage, upon returning to America and after his journey to the Ultra-Realm, was merged with Falkon, Prince of Bliss, after his death at the hands of his opposite, Maurkon, Prince of Rage. 

Seven princes of light existed in the Ultra-Realm (Erosanda: the Prince of Love, the previously mentioned Falkon, Krishlar: the Prince of Peace, Kontentos: the Prince of Grace, Sain: the Prince of Order, Satorana: the Prince of Enlightenment, and Viridium: the Prince of Life) as did their opposites, the seven princes of darkness (Lashtarr: the Prince of Madness, previously mentioned Maurkon, Mortanos: the Prince of Death, Myridian: the Prince of Hate, Shatragon: the Prince of Chaos, Squamonton: the Prince of Greed, and Zorla: the Prince of War).  

Michael Savage as Falkon travels the Ultra-Realm, eventually killing all the other Princes and thus becoming the Overlord of the Ultra-Realm, which he recreates with Princes and Princesses in place of the all-male Princes that existed previously. The special issue was set in this recreated Ultra-Realm and dealt primarily with the Princes and Princesses of Love (Eros and Sanda) and Hate (Myra and Rhydian).

1986 comics debuts
1987 comics endings
Comics by Doug Moench
DC Comics limited series
Fantasy comics
Comics set in the Middle Ages